Matt House is an American football coach who is currently the defensive coordinator for the LSU Tigers.

Coaching career
House began his coaching career at his alma mater Michigan State University in 2001. After the 2002 season he went to the University of North Carolina where he served as an assistant defensive coach for two season.  House would move to the National Football League in 2006.  In 2006 he became the Buffalo Bulls’ defensive backs coach and recruiting coordinator. He made the jump to the NFL in 2008 as an assistant special teams coach for the  Panthers. For the next three years he coached in St. Louis under Steve Spagnuolo as a defensive quality control coach. In 2012 he returned to the college ranks working at Pitt as the team's secondary coach. The following year he was promoted to defensive coordinator where he stayed until the end of the 2014 season. In 2015 he served as FIUs defensive coordinator and inside linebackers coach. 

For 2016, he joined Mark Stoops Kentucky staff as the team's inside linebackers coach and special teams coordinator. The following season he was promoted to defensive coordinator and remained in that position until the end of the 2018 season when he made his return to the National Football League. 

In 2019, House became the Chiefs’ linebackers coach, joining a staff that would go on to win the Super Bowl that season defeating the San Francisco 49ers, and then also make an appearance in the 2020 Super Bowl before losing to the Tampa Bay Buccaneers. In December 2021, House was named defensive coordinator at LSU.

References

Living people
Carolina Panthers coaches
FIU Panthers football coaches
Kansas City Chiefs coaches
Kentucky Wildcats football coaches
Michigan State University alumni
Michigan State Spartans football coaches
Year of birth missing (living people)
North Carolina Tar Heels football coaches
People from Clare County, Michigan